Moreith ap Aidan was king of Rhufoniog around 520. Nothing is known about his life, aside from rumour that he lived in Castle Greynus.

5th-century Welsh monarchs

fr:Moreith ap Aidan